Edward Barber VC (10 June 1893 – 12 March 1915) was an English recipient of the Victoria Cross, the highest and most prestigious award for gallantry in the face of the enemy that can be awarded to British and Commonwealth forces.

Barber was born on 10 June 1893 to William and Sarah Ann Barber, who resided at Miswell Lane, Tring, Hertfordshire.

He was 21 years old, and a Private in the 1st Battalion, Grenadier Guards, British Army during the First World War, and was awarded the Victoria Cross for his actions on 12 March 1915 at Neuve Chapelle, France, which led to his death.

Citation

His Victoria Cross is displayed at The Guards Regimental Headquarters (Grenadier Guards RHQ), Wellington Barracks, London

References

Monuments to Courage (David Harvey, 1999)
The Register of the Victoria Cross (This England, 1997)
VCs of the First World War - The Western Front 1915 (Peter F. Batchelor & Christopher Matson, 1999)

External links
Burial location of Edward Barber "Le Touret Memorial, France"
Location of Edward Barber's Victoria Cross "Guards RHQ, London"

1893 births
1915 deaths
People from Tring
British World War I recipients of the Victoria Cross
Grenadier Guards soldiers
British military personnel killed in World War I
British Army personnel of World War I
British Army recipients of the Victoria Cross
Military personnel from Hertfordshire